The Queen's Classroom is a 2013 South Korean television series starring Go Hyun-jung. A remake of the popular Japanese drama  that aired on NTV in 2005, it depicts a teacher whose rigid perfectionism and unique teaching methods conflicts with her young sixth grade students over the period of one school year.

It aired on MBC from June 12 to August 1, 2013 on Wednesdays and Thursdays at 21:55 for 16 episodes.

Cast

Faculty at Sandeul Elementary School
Go Hyun-jung as Ma Yeo-jin
Youn Yuh-jung as Principal Yong Hyun-ja
Lee Ki-young as Vice-Principal Song Young-man
Jung Suk-young as Goo Ja-song
Choi Yoon-young as Yang Min-hee
Jin Kyung as Jung Hwa-shin
Ricky Kim as Justin

Students of 6th Grade, Class 3

Kim Hyang-gi as Shim Ha-na
Chun Bo-geun as Oh Dong-gu
Kim Sae-ron as Kim Seo-hyun
Seo Shin-ae as Eun Bo-mi
Lee Young-yoo as Go Na-ri
Chu Ye-jin as Han Sun-young
Jung Ji-in as Seon Hwa-jung
Byun Seung-mi as Hwang Soo-jin
Jeon Park Yi-jin as Yoon Ji-min
Yang Hye-kyung as Kim Ga-eul
Kim Jung-yeon as Lee Da-in
Kim Ji-hoon as Kim Tae-sung
Kang Ji-won as Choi Bit-na
Lee Ji-oh as Cha Jung-soo
Son Sung-joon as Han Gook
Kang Chan-hee as Kim Do-jin
Shin Yi-joon as Pi Eun-soo
Im Je-noh as Jung Sang-taek
Park Woo-rim as Kwon Hyuk-pil
Ryu Ui-hyun as Jo Yeon-hoo
Kim Sang-woo as Park Kyung-hyun
Yoon Hye-sung as Yoo Seok-hwan
Kang Hyun-wook as Son In-bo

Parents' Association
Byun Jung-soo as Na-ri's mother
Lee Ah-hyun as Ha-na's mother
Kim Young-pil as Ha-na's father

Ratings
In the table below,  represent the lowest ratings and  represent the highest ratings.

Original soundtrack

Green Rain

"Green Rain" is a pop-R&B song performed by the South Korean boy group Shinee. The song and its instrumental version were released as a double-sided digital single on June 28, 2013 under the record labels of S.M. Entertainment and KT Music. "Green Rain" was the second soundtrack for the MBC TV drama series The Queen's Classroom to be unveiled, preceded by "The 2nd Drawer" from  labelmate Sunny. It was also used as the ending theme-song for the series.

Production and release
The song is written, composed, directed and arranged by S.M. Entertainment's resident music producer, Kenzie. She also contributed the lyrics of the song.  While the TV drama series started airing on June 12, 2013, the song was released as a digital single only after the fourth episode aired in South Korea. It was made available for music download on June 28, 2013.

Music video
The music video for "Green Rain" was released on July 16, 2013.

Track listing

Chart performance
"Green Rain" was released as a digital single and debuted at the spot 49 of South Korea's Gaon Weekly Singles Chart.

Awards and nominations

References

External links
 The Queen's Classroom official MBC website 
 The Queen's Classroom at MBC Global Media
 
 "Green Rain" on iTunes
 "Green Rain" on Naver

2013 South Korean television series debuts
2013 South Korean television series endings
MBC TV television dramas
Korean-language television shows
South Korean television series based on Japanese television series
South Korean comedy-drama television series
Television series by IOK Media